Shiri may refer to any of the following:

Shiri (fish), scientific name Coreoleuciscus splendidus
Shiri (film), a 1999 South Korean film which takes its name from the fish
Shiri (race), a fantasy subculture
Shiri, Khuzestan, a village in Khuzestan Province, Iran
Shiri, Kohgiluyeh and Boyer-Ahmad, a village in Kohgiluyeh and Boyer-Ahmad Province, Iran
Shiri Appleby, American actress
Shiri Artstein, Israeli mathematician
Shiri Maimon, Israeli singer
Perrance Shiri, commander of the Air Force of Zimbabwe
Shiri (honey) A Dagbanli name for honey

See also
Shir (disambiguation)
Shira (given name)

ja:シリ